Ivor Phillips (birth unknown) is a rugby union and professional rugby league footballer who played in the 1960s.

References

External links
Search for "Phillips" at rugbyleagueproject.org

Living people
Place of birth missing (living people)
Rugby league centres
Swinton Lions players
Warrington Wolves players
Year of birth missing (living people)